The Champaign County Courthouse is located at 200 North Main Street in Urbana, Ohio. The courthouse is designed in the International style prevalent in the 1950s by Phillip T. Partridge. The current building is the fifth for the county. The courthouse is included within the bounds of the Urbana Monument Square Historic District, but is not a contributing property.

History
Champaign County was established in 1805 and the county seat was placed at Springfield. Until 1807 the courts met in the home of a local citizen, George Fithian. Unfortunately, most of the county records relating to this period of history were lost. The county seat was removed to Urbana in 1807.

Even though land was set aside for a courthouse on a public square, the courthouse was built elsewhere. This structure was a simple log house which was converted into a private home after the court relocated. During the War of 1812 the courthouse was used as an army hospital and the court was removed to the upper story of the county jail. This arrangement continued until 1817 when a new courthouse was finished.

The county decided on a new courthouse and construction began on the public square in 1814 and was completed in 1817. This two-story brick structure had a central entrance located on the front facade and a central bell tower. The bell would ring to alert local citizens  of public meetings, fires, births or deaths. A special club was used in the most important events and produced a distinctive high pitched tone.

The county decided to build a new courthouse in 1837 and chose a site once again removed from the public square. The site chosen was the corner of North Main Street and East Court Street, which is still the present site of the courthouse. This courthouse was designed by the architectural firm of Hall and Sheldon and was completed ahead of schedule in 1839. This two-story brick structure was later remodeled in 1880 after it was deemed to be dangerous. The remodeling used the plans of the courthouse in Hillsboro right down to the new classical portico with Ionic columns and belltower. This new remodel was considered by many to fireproof the building. This was to be proved wrong on January 20, 1948, when a fire completely destroyed the building.

The fire of the courthouse placed the county in a bind. With no money in the budget for construction, several ballots were voted on to raise funds but were all defeated. A group of citizens campaigned for a final bond which passed with a sum of $650,000. This was not enough so the county officials decided to pay for the cost to equip the courthouse out of the county's fund which left restricted spending for several years. 

Architect Phillip Partridge was selected to design the fifth courthouse. He designed the building in the International style of the 1950s. The building was dedicated to much ceremony on June 8, 1957. Attending this ceremony was Governor C. William O'Neill, whose speech preceded the open house.

Exterior
The courthouse called for four floors but this was deleted after realizing this would cost too much. The building is constructed in International style, which calls for little or no external decoration. The walls are made up of red brick with large rectangular window panels. The recessed entrance is reached by a flight of stairs and is framed by 4 large square pillars of granite blocks.

References
Notes

Further reading
Marzulli, Lawrence J., The Development of Ohio's Counties and Their Historic Courthouses, Gray Printing Company, Fostoria, Ohio 1983
Stebbins, Clair, Ohio's Court Houses, Ohio State Bar Association, Columbus, Ohio 1980
Thrane, Susan W., County Courthouses of Ohio, Indiana University Press, Indianapolis, Indiana 2000 

Urbana, Ohio
County courthouses in Ohio
Government buildings completed in 1956
Buildings and structures in Champaign County, Ohio